Breakaway is a brand of chocolate-covered digestive biscuit from Nestlé, which started production in 1970 in the United Kingdom, manufactured by Rowntree Mackintosh Confectionery, company then acquired by Nestlé, which holds rights to the brand.

Ingredients 

Milk Chocolate (52%) (Sugar, Cocoa butter, Cocoa mass, Dried whole milk, Whey powder, Vegetable fat, Emulsifiers (Soya lecithin, E476), flavouring), wheat flour, wholemeal (10%), vegetable fat, sugar, whole oatflour, coconut, invert sugar syrup, barley malt extract, raising agents (ammonium bicarbonate, sodium bicarbonate), salt.

Advertising
A mid-1970s United Kingdom television commercial for the brand starred Eric Idle in a variation on his "Nudge Nudge" sketch from Monty Python's Flying Circus. Later stage performances of the original sketch included a comic reference to the commercial, as on the LP Monty Python Live at Drury Lane.

See also
 List of chocolate-covered foods
 List of chocolate bar brands

References

External links 

 

1970 establishments in Switzerland
Nestlé brands
Chocolate bars
Biscuit brands
Chocolate-covered foods